Valdovecaria bradyrrhoella is a species of snout moth in the genus Valdovecaria. It was described by Zerny in 1927. It is found in Spain and France.

References

Moths described in 1927
Anerastiini
Moths of Europe